Paul J. Longua (April 17, 1903 – June 13, 1983) was a professional football player with the Orange Tornadoes and Newark Tornadoes of the National Football League. He also played pro football for the independent Millville Big Blue in 1925. He would finish the 1925 season with 3 touchdowns. Afterwards he played with the Staten Island Stapletons prior to the team joining the NFL. On October 6, 1929, Longua ran 60 yards for a touchdown to give the Orange Tornadoes a 7–0 victory over the Boston Bulldogs.

Longua played college football at Villanova University prior to playing professionally. While at Villanova, Longua completed the longest punt in school history on November 25, 1922 against Duquesne University. The punt was record as going 95 yards.

References
Villanova Wildcats football records
Millville Big Blue
1929 NFL season summary
Just Staten out On the Island
1989-1980 Necrology - Oldest Living Football Players

1903 births
1983 deaths
Sportspeople from Brooklyn
Players of American football from New York City
Villanova Wildcats football players
Millville Football & Athletic Club players
Staten Island Stapletons players
Orange Tornadoes players
Newark Tornadoes players